Tallassee is an unincorporated community in Blount County, Tennessee, United States. Its ZIP code is 37878.

Tallassee is located along U.S. Route 129 (Calderwood Highway) approximately a half mile west of Chilhowee Dam along the banks of the Little Tennessee River.

Notes

Unincorporated communities in Blount County, Tennessee
Unincorporated communities in Tennessee